James A. Lantz (September 15, 1921 – June 19, 2014) was an American lawyer and politician.

Born in Fairfield County, Ohio, Lantz served in the United States Army Air Forces as a pilot. He received his bachelor's degree from Denison University and his law degree from Moritz College of Law. Lantz then practiced law in Lancaster, Ohio. From 1953 to 1963, Lantz served as a Democrat in the Ohio House of Representatives and was speaker in 1959. Lantz  lost the Democrat primary election for Lieutenant Governor of Ohio. He returned to his law practice in Lancaster, Ohio and was involved in the insurance business. Lantz died in Lancaster, Ohio.

Notes

1921 births
2014 deaths
People from Lancaster, Ohio
Denison University alumni
Ohio State University Moritz College of Law alumni
United States Army Air Forces pilots of World War II
Military personnel from Ohio
Businesspeople from Ohio
Ohio lawyers
Speakers of the Ohio House of Representatives
Democratic Party members of the Ohio House of Representatives
20th-century American businesspeople
20th-century American lawyers